The F-class was a class of two trams built by Duncan & Fraser, Adelaide, for the Prahran & Malvern Tramways Trust (PMTT). Both passed to the Melbourne & Metropolitan Tramways Board on 2 February 1920 when it took over the PMTT, becoming the F-class and retaining their running numbers. They were designed as summer cars, with five doors on each side. When rebuilt in 1923, some of the doors were filled in and longitudinal seating was fitted.

References

Melbourne tram vehicles
600 V DC multiple units